Holoperas oenochroalis is a species of snout moth in the genus Holoperas. It was described by Émile Louis Ragonot in 1890. It is found in Venezuela.

References

Moths described in 1890
Chrysauginae